Psychrophrynella glauca is a species of frog in the family Strabomantidae. It is endemic to the Distrito Ollachea, Peru, and is found on the Amazonian slopes of the Andes at an elevation of 2225 meters above sea level. It is a poorly known species.

References 

glauca
Amphibians of the Andes
Amphibians of Peru
Endemic fauna of Peru
Amphibians described in 2018
Taxa named by John Douglas Lynch
Taxonomy articles created by Polbot